Dental vibration appliances, sold under the brand name AcceleDent, OrthoAccel, and Tooth Masseuse, are devices that apply vibration called "micropulses" to dental braces and are claimed to thus speed tooth movement. Evidence as of 2015 was unclear if the appliances were able to accomplish this.

There have been few studies looking into the devices' safety and effectiveness. It is therefore not possible to determine if they speed tooth movement.

References

Dental equipment